Fiadanana may refer to several municipalities in Madagascar:

 Fiadanana, Ambohidratrimo, a municipality in Ambohidratrimo (district), Analamanga
 Fiadanana, Ambohimahasoa, a municipality in Haute Matsiatra
 Fiadanana, Ankazobe, a municipality in Ankazobe (district), Analamanga
 Fiadanana, Fandriana, a municipality in Amoron'i Mania
 Fiadanana, Nosy Varika, a municipality in Vatovavy